Hurricane Brenda of August 1973 was the first tropical cyclone on record to make landfall in the Mexican state of Campeche. The tropical wave that spawned Brenda moved off the west coast of Africa on August 9, and uneventfully traversed the Atlantic. By August 18, an associated area of low pressure developed sufficient convective activity to be declared a tropical depression. Later that day, the system intensified into a tropical storm before moving inland over the Yucatan Peninsula. Brenda had moved back over water by August 21 and began to quickly intensify, with an eye forming later that day. The storm peaked as an upper-end Category 1 hurricane with winds of  before making landfall in Campeche. The hurricane rapidly weakened after moving over land and dissipated the following day.

Brenda made two landfalls in Mexico: first in the Yucatan and later in Campeche. Little damage resulted from the storm throughout the Yucatan Peninsula. However, severe damage took place in areas near Brenda's second landfall. A total of 10 people were killed by the hurricane and over 2,000 more were left homeless. Flooding caused by Brenda was considered to be the worst in over 25 years in some places.

Meteorological history

Hurricane Brenda originated from a tropical wave that moved off the western coast of Africa on August 9; however, the initial wave quickly weakened upon entering the Atlantic Ocean. By August 13, the wave began to regenerate as it passed through the Lesser Antilles, producing scattered shower and thunderstorm activity. Several days later, convection associated with the system consolidated into a central, organized mass and on August 18, the system had become sufficiently organized to be declared a tropical depression. Early the next day, the depression strengthened into Tropical Storm Brenda following reports of gale-force winds from ships in the vicinity of the storm. Prior to its first landfall, Brenda suddenly intensified, with the central barometric pressure decreasing to 992 mbar (hPa; 29.29 inHg) and winds reached .

Roughly 24 hours after landfall, the center of Brenda passed directly over the city of Mérida, Yucatán. By this time, a strong ridge over southern Texas and northern Mexico caused the storm to take an unusual southwest turn. Later on August 20, the center of Brenda moved into the Gulf of Mexico, specifically the Bay of Campeche. Once back over water, Brenda began to quickly intensify, attaining hurricane status later that day. The storm made landfall later that day near Ciudad del Carmen, Mexico at this intensity, becoming the first hurricane to strike the region on record. After moving inland, Brenda rapidly weakened to a depression by the morning of August 22 and dissipated later that day.

Impact and aftermath
The tropical wave that spawned Brenda produced significant amounts of rainfall in the Cayman Islands as it became better organized. Following its first landfall in the northern Yucatan, Brenda produced heavy rainfall and high winds, gusting near . Offshore, a freighter with 25 crewman became trapped in the storm after its engines failed. The United States Coast Guard responded to the distress call sent out by the ship once Brenda had moved into the Gulf of Mexico on August 21.

Already suffering from severe flooding that killed at least 18 people and left 200,000 homeless, Hurricane Brenda worsened the situation with torrential rainfall and additional flooding. Following the damage wrought by Brenda, a large earthquake struck the region, hampering relief efforts and collapsing numerous structures. Brenda caused a total of 10 deaths. Two of the fatalities occurred in Campeche after 80% of the city was flooded. Two more of these deaths occurred in the coastal city of Veracruz. This was considered to be the worst flooding in the city in over 25 years. According to officials, 452 homes and the local docks were destroyed in the region. An estimated 2,000 people were left homeless as a direct result of Brenda throughout Mexico.

See also

1973 Atlantic hurricane season
Other storms of the same name

References

External links
Monthly Weather Review for 1973

Brenda (1973)
Brenda
Brenda (1973)